, also known as , refers to a type of dancing and cheering gestures performed by wota, fans of Japanese idol singers (and thus seen as Akiba-kei), involving jumping, clapping, arm-waving and chanting slogans. Wotagei is performed at concerts, or at events such as anime and manga conventions and meetings of idol fan groups, and it is thought to have developed from the ōendan, organised cheering squads common at sporting events in Japan. Wotagei is particularly associated with fans of Hello! Project and AKB48 idols, as well as fans of anime and game voice actresses (seiyuu), who often perform theme songs for the series in which they appear.

Chants  
There are specific actions associated with "wotagei", such as physical poses and chants (shout or yell).

Cheers 
The "Call" is commonly used shout or yell
 "urya" and "oi"

Mixing 
The most commonly used chant is known as the mix, which follows a set rhythm and is typically shouted during the introduction and instrumental breaks of an idol's song. However, it is generally considered improper to use it during a slow or emotional song. The mix is universal and is not associated with a specific idol group. It consists of three main variations: the Standard Mix, the Japanese Mix, and the Ainu Mix. Some idols also have their own specific versions of the Mix unique to them.

 Standard Mix
The Standard Mix is the most commonly used mix of the three, and is also known as the First Mix as it is typically heard during the introduction of the song. In English, it follows the order below.
"Tiger, Fire, Cyber, Fiber, Diver, Viber, Jyaa jyaa!!"
"タイガー、ファイヤー、サイバー、ファイバー、ダイバー、バイバー、ジャージャー"　("Taigā, Faiyā, Saibā, Faibā, Daibā, Baibā, Jā jā!!")
This mix is used by AKB48 fans.

Japanese Mix
The Japanese Mix is the translated Standard Mix, and is typically heard at the end of the first instrumental break, leading into the second verse of the song. Due to this, the Japanese Mix is sometimes referred to as the Second Mix.
"虎、火、人造、繊維、海女、振動、化繊飛除去"
"トラ、ヒ、ジンゾウ、センイ、アマ、シンドウ、カセントビジョキョ"　("Tora, Hi, Jinzō, Sen'i, Ama, Shindou, Kasentobijokyo!!")
Oftentimes, "Kasentobijokyo" is abbreviated to "Kasen." This is also used by AKB48 fans as well.

Ainu Mix
The Ainu Mix is another translated version of the mix. It is also known as the Third Mix, but is only used when there is a third instrumental in the song.
"チャペ、アペ、カラ、キナ、ララ、トゥスケ、ミョーホントゥスケ"　("Chape, Ape, Kara, Kina, Rara, Tusuke, Myōhontusuke!!")

Performance 
Wotagei is performed with a glow stick. Here are some common dances in wotagei:
 Tiger
 Romance
 Kecak
 Thunder Snake

References

External links 

 "Wota lota love" by Eric Prideaux, The Japan Times, January 16, 2005.
 "J-Pop's dream factory" by Chris Campion, Observer Music Monthly, August 21, 2005.
 "¿Qué es el wotagei?", Wota.tv, October 23, 2006.
 "Wotagei & Chant guide" by Turbos86, May 11, 2009

Anime and manga terminology
Society of Japan
Japanese subcultures
Japanese popular culture